The 2019 Munster Senior Football Championship was the 2019 installment of the annual Munster Senior Football Championship organised by the Munster GAA. The fixtures were announced on 12 October 2018.

Darren Mulhearne notably made his championship debut for Waterford against Clare in the quarter-final at the age of 46, believed to be the oldest player to debut. Two of his opponents in that game, and fellow debutants, had a combined age that was less than that of Mulhearne. He kept a clean sheet, in a one-point loss. Mulhearne was called into the team after Aaron Beresford sustained an injury. Mulhearne had first been part of the Waterford senior team as a 17-year-old schoolboy, but never played.

Teams
The Munster championship is contested by all six counties in the Irish province of Munster.

Bracket

Quarter-finals 

The 4 non-finalists of the 2018 championship entered this round. The lowest ranked counties to play in the quarter-finals are Limerick and Waterford of Division 4.

Semi-finals 

The 2 finalists of the 2018 championship entered this round along with the 2 quarter-final winners. The lowest ranked counties to play in the semi-finals are and Limerick of Division 3.

Final 
	

Kerry advance to the All-Ireland quarter-finals while Cork advance to the qualifiers.

See also
 2019 All-Ireland Senior Football Championship
 2019 Connacht Senior Football Championship
 2019 Leinster Senior Football Championship
 2019 Ulster Senior Football Championship

References

External links
 https://web.archive.org/web/20121028164800/http://munstergaa.ie/

2M
Munster Senior Football Championship